Back Creek is a  tributary of Conococheague Creek in south central Pennsylvania in the United States.

The uppermost reaches of the creek, flowing through the Letterkenny Army Depot, are known as Rocky Spring Run or Rocky Spring Branch.

See also
 List of rivers of Pennsylvania

References

Rivers of Pennsylvania
Tributaries of the Potomac River
Rivers of Franklin County, Pennsylvania